Maxwell Edgar Fatchen, AM (3 August 192014 October 2012) was an Australian children's writer and journalist.

Early life
Fatchen was born at "Narma" private hospital, South Terrace, Adelaide, the only son of Cecil William Fatchen and Isabel Harriet Fatchen, née Ridgway, of "Garowen", Angle Vale.

He spent his childhood on an Adelaide Plains farm at Angle Vale. He learned to drive a team of Clydesdale horses and did part of his secondary school studies at home, driving his horse and buggy once a week to Gawler High School to have his papers corrected.

Career
He entered journalism as a copy boy, and after five years in the Australian Army and Royal Australian Air Force during World War II, he became a journalist with The News and later The Advertiser. He covered many major stories in Australia and overseas.

Four decades of writing for children, especially those of primary school age, began in 1966 with The River Kings. His children's poems, such as "Just fancy that", remain popular. He wrote 20 books; his novels appear in seven countries, and his poetry appears throughout the English-speaking world.

The River Kings and Conquest of the River were the basis for a TV mini-series, The River Kings, in 1991.

Later life
He died on 14 October 2012 in his sleep.

Honours and legacy

Three of his books  received commendations in the Children's Book of the Year Award.
Member of the Order of Australia in 1980.
Advance Australia Award for literature in 1991.
Walkley Award for journalism in 1996.
Primary English Teaching Associations Award for children's poetry in 1996.
"SA Great" Award for Literature in 1999.
Centenary of Federation Medal in 2003 for service to the community in journalism, poetry, and writing for children.
Inaugural Life Member of the SA Writers Centre in 2004 for long years of support, encouragement, and ambassadorship for the Centre.
 Max Fatchen Drive in Angle Vale and the Max Fatchen Expressway ( also known as the Northern Expressway ) are named after him.
The Max Fatchen Fellowship was named to celebrate his achievements and commitment to children’s literature and the local writing community. It is open to South Australian writers for young people.

Bibliography
By Max Fatchen
The River Kings (1966) novel set on River Murray paddle steamer in early 20th century 
Flodens Konger (1966) The River Kings translated into Danish 
Conquest of the River, illustrated by Clyde Pearson, published Methuen & Co. (1970)  
Note: This and The River Kings above were the basis of the 1991 television series The River Kings 
The Spirit Wind, illustrated by Trevor Stubley, published Methuen (1973) novel set in outback South Australia  Also available in braille edition
Time Wave, illustrated by Edward Mortelmans (1978) novel for children 
Songs for My Dog and Other People, illustrated by Michael Atchison Penguin Books (1980) 
Closer to the Stars; publisher Methuen (1981), republished Puffin Books (1983) novel set in wartime 1941  
Wry Rhymes for Troublesome Times (1983) 2nd ed. Puffin Books (1985) 
Chase through the night; illustrated by Graham Humphreys, publisher Methuen (1983) novel set in outback Queensland 
Forever Fatchen, Advertiser Newspapers Ltd. (1983) 
A Paddock of Poems Penguin Books Australia (1987) 
Had Yer Jabs? Methuen Australia (1987) collection of short stories for children  
A Pocketful of Rhymes, Penguin Books Australia (1989) 
A Country Christmas illustrated by Timothy Ide (1990)  
The Country Mail is Coming (1990) poems reminiscing about growing up in country South Australia 
Peculiar Rhymes and Lunatic Lines ed. Naia Bray-Moffatt, illustrated by Lesley Bisseker, publisher Orchard Books (1995) 
Mostly Max, illustrated by Michael Atchison, Wakefield Press (1995) selected from 50 years of Fatchen's columns in The Advertiser 
Australia at the Beach illustrated Tom Jellett (1999)
Songs for My Dog and Other Wry Rhymes illustrated by Michael Atchison, Wakefield Press (1999) 
Note: This may be a revised edition of Songs for My Dog and Other People (1980) above
The Very Long Nose of Jonathan Jones, illustrated by Craig Smith, ABC Books (2000) humorous story told in verse 
Terrible Troy, illustrated by Stephen Axelsen, ABC Books (2000) humorous stories told in verse 
Poetry All Sorts: The Max Fatchen Reciter, illustrated by Christina Booth, Triple-D Books (2003)  
Meet the Monsters, illustrated by Cheryll Johns, Omnibus Books (2004) rhyming picture book 
As co-author or contributor
Soundings: Poetry and Poetics proceedings of the Third Biennial National Conference on Poetry, Adelaide, 7–9 November 1997 / edited by Lyn Jacobs and Jeri Kroll, publisher Wakefield Press (1998) 
Tea for Three with Colin Thiele, illustrated by Craig Smith, published Harcourt Education (1993) 
Are You in There? with Rosaleen Stewart, illustrated by Mitch Vane (2004) 
Tadpoles in the Torrens: Poems for Young Readers (2013) ed. Jude Aquilina; poems by Christobel Mattingley, Janeen Brian, Max Fatchen, Peter Combe, and Sean Williams 
Biography
Andrew Male Other Times Wakefield Press, Adelaide (1997) includes selections from Max's writings, many not previously republished

References

External links

State Library of South Australia library guide

2012 deaths
1920 births
Australian children's writers
Members of the Order of Australia
Walkley Award winners
Royal Australian Air Force personnel of World War II
Royal Australian Air Force officers
Australian Army soldiers
Writers from Adelaide
20th-century Australian poets
Australian male poets
People from Gawler, South Australia
20th-century Australian male writers
Australian Army personnel of World War II